Young Man with a Horn is an album that was released by Columbia Records in 1950. It features trumpeter Harry James and singer Doris Day performing songs initially recorded for the soundtrack of the film of the same name.

Background and recording
The film Young Man with a Horn was loosely based on the life of Bix Beiderbecke. The soundtrack was played by trumpeter Harry James and his orchestra. Doris Day, who appears in the film, also sang on some of the album's tracks.

Release and reception
Young Man with a Horn was released by Columbia Records in 1950 as the 10-inch LP CL-6106. According to Billboard, on February 3, 1950, Columbia held an advance screening of the film in Hollywood, along with playback of the new record, for Columbia distributors and dealers, hosted by James and his wife, Betty Grable. Billboard prognosticated, "Disks will get heavy exploitation thru the pic tie-up coincidental to the film's general release."

It was enormously successful commercially, spending 11 weeks at the No. 1 spot on Billboard's album charts, albeit non-consecutively. Day and James shared the 5 percent royalty for album sales.

Track listing
(All tracks with Harry James, specified ones with Doris Day)

"I May Be Wrong (But I Think You're Wonderful)" (Harry Ruskin/Henry Sullivan) (Doris Day) - 3:01
"The Man I Love" (George Gershwin/Ira Gershwin) - 3:05
"The Very Thought Of You" (Ray Noble) (Doris Day) - 3:00
"Melancholy Rhapsody" (Sammy Cahn/Ray Heindorf) - 2:59
"Get Happy"  (Harold Arlen/Ted Koehler) - 2:56
"Too Marvelous For Words" (Richard A. Whiting/Johnny Mercer) (Doris Day) 3:17
"LImehouse Blues" (Philip Braham/Douglas Furber)
"With A Song In My Heart" (Richard Rodgers/Lorenz Hart) (Doris Day) - 3:07

This album was expanded into a 12" version in 1954, Columbia CL 582, and currently available compact disc adding the following tracks:
"Would I Love You" (B. Russell/Spina) (Doris Day with Harry James)
"Pretty Baby" (Kahn/Van Alstyne/Jackson) (Doris Day without Harry James)
"I Only Have Eyes for You" (Al Dubin/Harry Warren) (Doris Day with Harry James)
"Lullaby of Broadway" (Al Dubin/Harry Warren) (Doris Day with Harry James)

Credits
 Milton Ager	Composer
 Harold Arlen	Composer
 Ben Bernie	Composer
 Philip Braham	Composer
 Sammy Cahn	Composer
 Hoagy Carmichael	Dub Mixing
 Buddy Cole	Piano
 James Cook	Sax (Tenor)
 Corky Corcoran	Sax (Tenor)
 Michael Curtiz	Director
 Doris Day	Vocals
 Howard Dietz	Composer
 Kirk Douglas	Dub Mixing, Trumpet
 Al Dubin	Composer
 Ziggy Elmer	Trombone
 J. Filmore	Composer
 Douglas Furber	Composer
 George Gershwin	Composer
 Ira Gershwin	Composer
 Franz Gruber	Composer
 Lorenz Hart	Composer
 Ray Heindorf	Composer, Musical Direction
 Harry James	Composer, Musical Direction, Trumpet
 Harry James & His Orchestra	Performer, Primary Artist
 Gus Kahn	Composer
 Ted Koehler	Composer
 Ted McCord	Photography
 Bruce McDonald	Piano
 Johnny Mercer	Composer
 Ray Noble	Composer
 Maceo Pinkard	Composer
 Bob Poland	Sax (Baritone)
 Cole Porter	Composer
 Tony Rizzi	Guitar
 Richard Rodgers	Composer
 Archie Rosate	Clarinet
 Harry Ruskin	Composer
 Babe Russin	Sax (Tenor)
 Willie Smith	Sax (Alto)
 Max Steiner	Composer, Primary Artist
 Bob Stone	Bass
 Henry Sullivan	Composer
 Swift	Composer
 Traditional	Composer
 Egbert VanAlstyne	Composer
 Jerry Wald	Producer
 William Wallace	Set Decoration
 Richard A. Whiting	Composer
 Fred Witing	Composer
 Stanley Wrightsman Piano

Source:

References

1950 soundtrack albums
Musical film soundtracks
Doris Day soundtracks
Columbia Records soundtracks